The 2021 Emilia-Romagna Open was a tennis tournament played on clay courts. It was the 1st edition of the event for male and female professional tennis players, respectively. It was part of the 2021 ATP Tour and the 2021 WTA Tour and took place in Parma, Italy.

Champions

Men's singles

  Sebastian Korda def.  Marco Cecchinato 6–2, 6–4

Women's singles

  Coco Gauff def.  Wang Qiang 6–1, 6–3

Men's doubles

  Simone Bolelli /  Máximo González def.  Oliver Marach /  Aisam-ul-Haq Qureshi 6–3, 6–3

Women's doubles

  Coco Gauff /  Caty McNally def.  Darija Jurak /  Andreja Klepač 6–3, 6–2

Points and prize money

Point distribution

Prize money 

*per team

ATP singles main-draw entrants

Seeds

1 Rankings are as of May 17, 2021.

Other entrants
The following players received wildcards into the main draw:
  Marco Cecchinato
  Flavio Cobolli
  Andreas Seppi

The following players received entry from the qualifying draw:
  Daniel Altmaier
  Raúl Brancaccio
  Pedro Martínez
  Mikael Ymer

The following player received entry as a lucky loser:
  Norbert Gombos

Withdrawals
Before the tournament
  Lloyd Harris → replaced by  Lorenzo Musetti
  John Isner → replaced by  Salvatore Caruso
  Cameron Norrie → replaced by  Marcos Giron
  Reilly Opelka → replaced by  Steve Johnson
  Frances Tiafoe → replaced by  Norbert Gombos

Retirements
  Benoît Paire

ATP doubles main-draw entrants

Seeds

 Rankings are as of 18 May 2021

Other entrants
The following pairs received wildcards into the doubles main draw:
  David Marrero /  David Vega Hernández
  Francesco Passaro /  Stefano Travaglia

Withdrawals
Before the tournament
  Roman Jebavý /  Jiří Veselý → replaced by  Roman Jebavý /  Aleksandr Nedovyesov
  John Peers /  Michael Venus → replaced by  Matt Reid /  Michael Venus
  Ken Skupski /  Neal Skupski → replaced by  Marco Cecchinato /  Andreas Seppi

During the tournament
  Sander Gillé /  Joran Vliegen

WTA singles main-draw entrants

Seeds

1 Rankings are as of 10 May 2021.

Other entrants
The following players received wildcards into the main draw:
  Sara Errani
  Giulia Gatto-Monticone
  Serena Williams
  Venus Williams

The following players received entry from the qualifying draw:
  Martina Di Giuseppe
  Anna-Lena Friedsam
  Caty McNally
  Paula Ormaechea
  Lisa Pigato
  Anna Karolína Schmiedlová

The following player received entry as a lucky loser:
  Liudmila Samsonova

Withdrawals 
Before the tournament
  Bianca Andreescu → replaced by  Camila Giorgi
  Marie Bouzková → replaced by  Nao Hibino
  Alizé Cornet → replaced by  Jasmine Paolini
  Madison Keys → replaced by  Clara Tauson
  Veronika Kudermetova → replaced by  Ana Bogdan
  Jessica Pegula → replaced by  Varvara Gracheva
  Alison Riske → replaced by  Liudmila Samsonova
  Jil Teichmann → replaced by  Viktorija Golubic
  Dayana Yastremska → replaced by  Misaki Doi

Retirements 
  Sara Sorribes Tormo

WTA doubles main-draw entrants

Seeds

 Rankings are as of 10 May 2021

Other entrants
The following pairs received wildcards into the doubles main draw:
  Nuria Brancaccio /  Lisa Pigato
  Jessica Pieri /  Bianca Turati

The following pair received entry into the doubles main draw using a protected ranking:
  Viktorija Golubic /  Alexandra Panova

Withdrawals
Before the tournament
  Hayley Carter /  Luisa Stefani → replaced by  Vivian Heisen /  Wang Yafan
  Alla Kudryavtseva /  Valeria Savinykh → replaced by  Eden Silva /  Kimberley Zimmermann
  Arina Rodionova /  Anna Danilina → replaced by  Quinn Gleason /  Erin Routliffe

References

External links 
 
Tournament overview on ATP Tour website
Tournament overview on WTA Tour website

Emilia-Romagna Open
Emilia-Romagna Open
Emilia-Romagna Open
Emilia-Romagna Open
Emilia-Romagna Open